Macrognathus aral, the one-stripe spiny eel, is a small fish from Pakistan, India, Bangladesh, Nepal and Myanmar. It usually is found in running and stagnant waters of freshwater and brackish waters.

After mating, eggs are deposited by attaching on to algal masses.

In 2008, researches showed that what was once considered to be Macrognathus aral in Sri Lanka, is actually a separate species, Macrognathus pentophthalmos.

References

aral
Fish described in 1801